The "finger of God" ( ’etsba‘ ’Ĕlōhîm) is a phrase used in the Torah, translated into the Christian Bible. In Exodus 8:16–20 it is used during the plagues of Egypt by the Egyptian magicians. In Exodus 31:18 and Deuteronomy 9:10 it refers to the method by which the Ten Commandments were written on tablets of stone that were brought down from Mount Sinai by Moses. 

It was also used once by Jesus in the Gospel of Luke to describe how he had cast out demons.

Jews in the tradition of Maimonides posit that anthropomorphism in the Torah, such as the use of body part names, is completely metaphorical, as human bodies are based on potencies of God, not the other way around.

Hebrew Bible
The first time the phrase "finger of God" appears is in the Hebrew Bible, in the eighth chapter, in the paragraph of verses sixteen through twenty of the Book of Exodus, which reads

The second time the phrase "finger of God" appears is at the last verse, verse eighteen of the thirty-first chapter of the same book, which reads "And he gave unto Moses, when he had made an end of communing with him upon mount Sinai, two tables of testimony, tables of stone, written with the finger of God."

The third time the phrase appears is a second reference to the tablets of the Ten Commandments, and is found in Deuteronomy 9:10, which says "And the LORD delivered unto me two tables of stone written with the finger of God; and on them was written according to all the words, which the LORD spake with you in the mount out of the midst of the fire in the day of the assembly."

Writing on the wall
The fourth biblical mention is during Belshazzar's Feast in Daniel 5, when scripture reports 'fingers of a man's hand' wrote on the wall:

Daniel reads the words "MENE, MENE, TEKEL, UPHARSIN" and interprets them for the king: "MENE, God has numbered the days of your kingdom and brought it to an end; TEKEL, you have been weighed ... and found wanting;" and "PERES, your kingdom is divided and given to the Medes and Persians. Then Belshazzar gave the command, and Daniel was clothed in purple, a chain of gold was put around his neck, and a proclamation was made… that he should rank third in the kingdom; [and] that very night Belshazzar the Chaldean (Babylonian) king was killed, and Darius the Mede received the kingdom."

The phrase the writing on the wall has entered our lexicon from this reference to mean a warning of impending doom.

New Testament

The Greek phrase (en dactylō Theou, "by the finger of God") is also used by Jesus in the Christian New Testament during his reply to those who said that he cast out demons by the power of Beelzebub. He said, "But if it is by the finger of God that I cast out the demons, then the kingdom of God has come to you."

In the New Testament story of Jesus and the woman taken in adultery, Jesus writes in the dust of the earth with his finger. Pope Benedict XVI notes from St Augustine that this gesture can be seen as portraying Christ as the divine legislator; Jesus' actions in writing in the dust are redolent of the Finger of God writing the Law on tablets of stone.

See also 
 Act of God
 Belshazzar's feast
 The Creation of Adam

References

External links 
The Holy Bible - King James Version (from which was taken the quotes of this article)
Jewish Encyclopedia: Finger

Ten Commandments
Biblical phrases
Anthropomorphism
Belshazzar
Book of Daniel chapters